Joseph Lynn (15 February 1856 – 2 February 1927) was an English first-class cricketer.

Lynn represented Hampshire in one first-class match in 1875 against Sussex. In Sussex's second innings Lynn took 2 wickets for 25 runs.

Lynn died in Southampton, Hampshire on 2 February 1927.

External links
Joseph Lynn at Cricinfo
Joseph Lynn at CricketArchive

1856 births
1927 deaths
People from Newington, London
Cricketers from Greater London
English cricketers
Hampshire cricketers